Carposina candace is a moth in the family Carposinidae. It was described by Edward Meyrick in 1932. It is found in Ethiopia.

References

Endemic fauna of Ethiopia
Carposinidae
Moths described in 1932
Moths of Africa